is a former Japanese football player.

Playing career
Saito was born in Saitama on December 1, 1975. After graduating from Komazawa University, he joined Japan Football League club Omiya Ardija based in his local in 1998. He played many matches as defensive midfielder from first season. The club was promoted to J2 League from 1999 and J1 League from 2005. Although he played many matches for a long time, he could not play many matches in 2009 and retired end of 2009 season.

Club statistics

References

External links

1975 births
Living people
Komazawa University alumni
Association football people from Saitama Prefecture
Japanese footballers
J1 League players
J2 League players
Japan Football League (1992–1998) players
Omiya Ardija players
Association football midfielders